Charles Frederick Stacey (27 April 1878 – 1950) was an English first-class cricketer active 1901 who played for Surrey. He was born in Chalfont St Giles; died in Scotland.

References
Married Annie Ives in 1905, Chalfont St Giles.  By 1901 he was a professional cricketer.  Son of James Stacey and Mary Annie (née.Bolton).  3 children

1878 births
[[Category:1965. Hemel Hempstead. deaths]]
English cricketers
Surrey cricketers
1950 deaths